Romecke may refer to:

Romecke (Möhne), a river of North Rhine-Westphalia, Germany, tributary of the Möhne
Romecke (Linnepe), a river of North Rhine-Westphalia, Germany, tributary of the Linnepe